Buyende District is a district in Eastern Uganda. It is named after Buyende, the 'chief town' in the district and the location of the district headquarters.

Location
Buyende District is bordered by Amolatar District to the northwest, Kaberamaido District to the north, Serere District to the northeast, Kaliro District to the east, Luuka District to the southeast, Kamuli District to the south and Kayunga District to the west. The coordinates of the district are:01 11N, 33 10E.

Overview
Buyende District was created by Act of Parliament and began functioning on 1 July 2010. Prior to that, it was part of Kamuli District. One of the reasons given for the creation of Buyende District, was the long distance that residents had to travel from the remote areas in the north of the district, to access services at Kamuli, then district headquarters. The new district is primarily rural, with poor road infrastructure. , there are no hospitals in Buyende District.

Buyende District is part of Busoga sub-region. The districts that constitute Busoga sub-region include the following:

The sub-region is coterminous with Busoga Kingdom, one of the constitutional monarchies in today's Uganda. According to the 2002 national census, the subregion was home to an estimated 2.5 million people at that time.

Population
In 1991, the national population census estimated the district population at about 130,800. The 2002 Uganda national census estimated the population of Buyende District at about 191,300, with a population growth rate of 3.5% annually. In 2012, the population of Buyende District was estimated at 265,100.

See also

References

External links
  Buyende Officials Ask for More Cars

 
Busoga
Districts of Uganda
Eastern Region, Uganda
Lake Kyoga
White Nile